Allard, better known for light sports cars, produced a pilot run of around twenty fibreglass-bodied three-wheeled Clipper microcars in 1953–54. The rear-mounted Villiers 24B  single-cylinder two-stroke motorcycle engine drives the rear left wheel via a Burman gearbox and chain.

The car was designed by David Gottlieb and advertised as having an "indestructible" plastic body, made by Hordern-Richmond Ltd; the Clipper was the first car to have a colour-impregnated fibreglass body. It seats three adults on a bench seat and two children in optional dickey seats revealed when the rear boot is opened. The Clipper's lightweight body and small engine contributed to its weight of just . It was priced at £268 (equivalent to £ in ), although it never reached the production stage.

Project cancellation
The Clipper was intended to be sold in volume through motorcycle dealerships, to compete with the Bond Minicar. But cooling difficulties and driveshaft weakness made the Clipper very unreliable, and the project was discontinued in 1954. Motoring writer Giles Chapman rated the car at No. 1 in his list of the top ten most unreliable cars in The Worst Cars Ever Sold. As of 2001 there were three survivors, only one of which was in relatively good condition.

See also
List of microcars by country of origin

References

Notes

Citations

Bibliography

External links
 Allard Owners Club page on the Clipper 
 Information and photographs about the manufacture of the Clipper by Margaret Woolsey, one of the team involved with the car's production

Microcars
Three-wheeled motor vehicles
Clipper
Cars introduced in 1953